The Posta de Yatasto is an estate located near San José de Metán, Salta Province, Argentina. It is known for historical meetings that took place at the site during the Argentine War of Independence, and was designated a National Monument of Argentina in 1942.

History
This estate was built during colonial times, and it was used by people traveling between Buenos Aires and the Upper Peru, to rest and acquire new horses, if needed. The original name could have been either "Yatasto", "Ayatasto" or "Llatasto".

Don Vicente Toledo y Pimentel inherited and restored it in 1784. As he was a patriot, he supported the insurgent armies that moved to the north, and contributed 1,300 horses and 100 cows to General Juan Ramón Balcarce. The site was also used by patriotic generals to make handovers of command. Juan Martín de Pueyrredón gave the command of the Army of the North there to Manuel Belgrano on May 26, 1812; Belgrano would later give the command to José de San Martín on January 17, 1814, and Martín Miguel de Güemes would make his oath the following month. 

Currently, only a part of the original building remains. There are stone remains of old rooms and a small church. Current rooms are four rooms at the floor level, and one upper room that may be accessed with wood stairs. 

It was declared National Historic Monument of Argentina on July 14, 1942, by law Nº 95687. The owners donated it to the state on 1950, and it operates as a museum since then.

External links
 Historia de Yatasto 

National Historic Monuments of Argentina
Museums in Argentina
Museums established in 1950
Houses completed in 1784
Viceroyalty of the Río de la Plata
Buildings and structures in Salta Province
Tourist attractions in Salta Province